Heroes World Distribution Co., originally named Superhero Enterprises, was an American comic book distributor. It was founded by Ivan Snyder, active from 1975 to 1997, during the growth and consolidation of the direct market. Heroes World was acquired by Marvel Comics in late 1994 to act as the publisher's sole distributor. This ill-fated move, combined with other marketplace factors of the time, resulted in the financial failure of many other comics distributors and retailers — and the near collapse of the entire North American comic book market.

History

Origins 
In the early 1970s, Ivan Snyder was head of licensing in Marvel Comics Group's merchandising department. In this role, he was in charge of selling various Marvel licensed products via mail order. After a change in management in the mid-1970s, Marvel discontinued the mail order service, and  Snyder purchased the business in 1975, renaming it Superhero Enterprises. Initially running the business out his basement, Snyder shortly thereafter moved into a storefront in Morristown, New Jersey, with a catalog showroom store format.  A second store was opened in a Livingston shopping mall, with DC Comics products added to their product mix.

When the former Mego Corporation trademark "Superhero" was purchased by Marvel and DC, Superheroes Enterprise was forced to change its name to Heroes World. By 1982, Heroes World's retail chain had expanded to 12 locations, while it continued its mail order distribution business. (The Heroes World catalog was produced in conjunction with the Dover, New Jersey-based Joe Kubert School of Cartoon and Graphic Art.)

Acquisition by Marvel 
By late 1994, Heroes World was North America's third largest comics distributor (behind Diamond Comics Distributors and Capital City Distribution). On December 28, 1994, Heroes World was bought by Marvel Comics to act as the company's exclusive distributor, thus reducing other distributors' market share by more than a third. The change took effect with books shipped July 1995. As industry veteran Chuck Rozanski notes:

The ripple effect resulted in the survival of only one other major North American distributor, Diamond.

Heroes World's new role as Marvel's exclusive distributor was a failure from the beginning. Lacking the infrastructure to handle Marvel's huge weekly orders resulted in extensive shipment and billing mistakes, errors which caused great consternation among the thousands of comics specialty shops affected. Writes Rozanski:

These factors, combined with the collapse of the comics speculation market, did indeed result in many comics stores closing their doors for good.

Throughout 1995 and 1996, Heroes World continued to flounder, facing lost business and lawsuits. Finally, in 1997 the company went out of business, and Marvel returned to Diamond Distributors, which by that point was the only major distributor left standing.

Notes

References 
"Marvelutionary War Declared: Unprecedented Upheaval in Direct Market," The Comics Journal #175 (March 1995), pp. 9–10.
 "Marvel goes exclusive, Capital sues Marvel, Marvel settles with Capital, Marvel buys Skybox, DC/Diamond announcement expected," The Comics Journal #175 (March 1995), pp. 9–10.
 "Newswatch: Marvelutionary Changes," The Comics Journal #186 (Apr. 1996), p. 23.

See also
List of book distributors
Marvel

1997 disestablishments in New Jersey
Comics industry
Companies based in Morris County, New Jersey
Marvel Comics
Book distributors